Leila Laaraj is a Belgian actress and singer best known for her role in the Belgian sitcom Wittekerke.

She studied acting in the United States in both New York City and New Haven, CT. Her only available English-language work is the short film Shooting at the Moon.

References

External links
 

Year of birth missing (living people)
Living people
Belgian television actresses
Belgian women singers
Belgian film actresses
21st-century Belgian actresses